Graham Independent School District is a public school district based in Graham, Texas, United States.

Located in Young County, a very small portion of the district lies in Stephens County.

In 2009, the school district was rated "academically acceptable" by the Texas Education Agency.

Schools
Graham High School (Grades 9-12)
Graham Junior High (Grades 6-8)
Woodland Elementary (Grades 4-5)
Crestview Elementary (Grades 1-3)
Pioneer Elementary (Grades PK-K)

References

External links

School districts in Young County, Texas
School districts in Stephens County, Texas